Animal languages are forms of non-human animal communication that show similarities to human language. Animals communicate through a variety of signs, such as sounds or movements. Signing among animals may be considered complex enough to be a form of language if the inventory of signs is large. The signs are relatively arbitrary, and the animals seem to produce them with a degree of volition (as opposed to relatively automatic conditioned behaviors or unconditioned instincts, usually including facial expressions). In experimental tests, animal communication may also be evidenced through the use of lexigrams by chimpanzees and bonobos. 

Many researchers argue that animal communication lacks a key aspect of human language, the creation of new patterns of signs under varied circumstances. Humans, by contrast, routinely produce entirely new combinations of words. Some researchers, including the linguist Charles Hockett, argue that human language and animal communication differ so much that the underlying principles are unrelated.  Accordingly, linguist Thomas A. Sebeok has proposed to not use the term "language" for animal sign systems. However, other linguists and biologists, including Marc Hauser, Noam Chomsky, and W. Tecumseh Fitch, assert an evolutionary continuum exists between the communication methods of animal and human language.

Aspects of human language

Human language contains the following properties. Some experts argue these properties separate human language from animal communication:

Arbitrariness: There is usually no rational relationship between a sound or sign and its meaning. For example, there is nothing intrinsically house-like about the word "house".
Discreteness: Language is composed of small, separate, and repeatable parts (discrete units, e.g. morphemes) that are used in combination to create meaning.
Displacement: Language can be used to communicate about things that are not in the immediate vicinity either spatially or temporally.
Duality of patterning: The smallest meaningful units (words or morphemes) consist of sequences of units without meaning (sounds or phonemes). This is also referred to as double articulation.
Productivity: Users can understand and create an indefinitely large number of utterances.
Semanticity: Specific signals have specific meanings.

Research with apes, like that of Francine Patterson with Koko (gorilla) or Allen and Beatrix Gardner with Washoe (chimpanzee), suggested that apes are capable of using language that meets some of these requirements, including arbitrariness, discreteness, and productivity.

In the wild, chimpanzees have been seen "talking" to each other when warning about approaching danger. For example, if one chimpanzee sees a snake, he makes a low, rumbling noise, signaling for all the other chimps to climb into nearby trees. In this case, the chimpanzees' communication does not indicate displacement, as it is entirely contained to an observable event.

Arbitrariness has been noted in meerkat calls; bee dances demonstrate elements of spatial displacement; and cultural transmission has possibly occurred through language between the bonobos Kanzi and Panbanisha.

Human language may also not be completely "arbitrary." Research has shown that almost all humans naturally demonstrate limited crossmodal perception (e.g. synesthesia) and multisensory integration, as illustrated by the Kiki and Bouba study. Other recent research has tried to explain how the structure of human language emerged, comparing two different aspects of hierarchical structure present in animal communication and proposing that human language arose out of these two separate systems.

Claims that animals have language skills akin to humans however, are extremely controversial. In his book The Language Instinct, Steven Pinker illustrates that claims of chimpanzees acquiring language are exaggerated and rest on very limited or specious evidence.

The American linguist Charles Hockett theorized that there are sixteen features of human language that distinguish human communication from that of animals. He called these the design features of language. The features mentioned below have so far been found in all spoken human languages, and at least one is missing from any other animal communication system.
 Vocal-auditory channel: Sounds are emitted from the mouth and perceived by the auditory system. While this applies to many animal communication systems, there are many exceptions, such as those relying on visual communication. One example is cobras extending the ribs behind their heads to send the message of intimidation or of feeling threatened. In humans, sign languages provide many examples of fully formed languages that use a visual channel.
 Broadcast transmission and directional reception: This requires that the recipient can tell the direction that the signal comes from and thus the originator of the signal.
 Rapid fading (transitory nature): The signal lasts a short time. This is true of all systems involving sound. It does not take into account audio recording technology and is also not true for written language. It tends not to apply to animal signals involving chemicals and smells which often fade slowly. For example, a skunk's smell, produced in its glands, lingers to deter a predator from attacking.
 Interchangeability: All utterances that are understood can be produced. This is different from some communication systems where, for example, males produce one set of behaviors and females another and they are unable to interchange these messages so that males use the female signal and vice versa. For example, Heliothine moths have differentiated communication: females are able to send a chemical to indicate preparedness to mate, while males cannot send the chemical.
 Total feedback: The sender of a message is aware of the message being sent.
 Specialization: The signal produced is intended for communication and is not due to another behavior. For example, dog panting is a natural reaction to being overheated, but is not produced to specifically relay a particular message.
 Semanticity: There is some fixed relationship between a signal and a meaning.

Primate: studied examples
Humans are able to distinguish real words from fake words based on the phonological order of the word itself. In a 2013 study, baboons have been shown to have this skill, as well. The discovery has led researchers to believe that reading is not as advanced a skill as previously believed, but instead based on the ability to recognize and distinguish letters from one another. The experimental setup consisted of six young adult baboons, and results were measured by allowing the animals to use a touch screen and selecting whether or not the displayed word was indeed a real word, or a nonword such as "dran" or "telk." The study lasted for six weeks, with approximately 50,000 tests completed in that time. The experimenters explain the use of bigrams, which are combinations of two (usually different) letters. They tell us that the bigrams used in nonwords are rare, while the bigrams used in real words are more common. Further studies will attempt to teach baboons how to use an artificial alphabet.

In a 2016 study, a team of biologists from several universities concluded that macaques possess vocal tracts physically capable of speech, "but lack a speech-ready brain to control it".

Non-primates: studied examples

Among the most studied examples of animal languages are:

Birds
 Bird songs: Songbirds can be very articulate. Grey parrots are famous for their ability to mimic human language, and at least one specimen, Alex, appeared able to answer a number of simple questions about objects he was presented with. Parrots, hummingbirds and songbirds – display vocal learning patterns.

Insects
 Bee dance: Used to communicate direction and distance of food source in many species of bees.

Mammals
 African forest elephants: Cornell University's Elephant Listening Project began in 1999 when Katy Payne began studying the calls of African forest elephants in Dzanga National Park in the Central African Republic. Andrea Turkalo has continued Payne's work in Dzanga National Park observing elephant communication. For nearly 20 years, Turkalo has spent the majority of her time using a spectrogram to record the noises that the elephants make. After extensive observation and research, she has been able to recognize elephants by their voices. Researchers hope to translate these voices into an elephant dictionary, but that will likely not occur for many years. Because elephant calls are often made at very low frequencies, this spectrogram is able to detect lower frequencies that human ears are unable to hear, allowing Turkalo to get a better idea of what she perceives the elephants to be saying. Cornell's research on African forest elephants has challenged the idea that humans are considerably better at using language and that animals only have a small repertoire of information that they can convey to others. As Turkalo explained on 60 Minutes''' "The Secret Language of Elephants," "Many of their calls are in some ways similar to human speech."
Mustached bats: Since these animals spend most of their lives in the dark, they rely heavily on their auditory system to communicate. This acoustic communication includes echolocation or using calls to locate each other in the darkness. Studies have shown that mustached bats use a wide variety of calls to communicate with one another. These calls include 33 different sounds, or "syllables," that the bats then either use alone or combine in various ways to form "composite" syllables.
 Prairie dogs: Dr. Con Slobodchikoff studied prairie dog communication and discovered:
different alarm calls for different species of predators;
different escape behaviors for different species of predators;
transmission of semantic information, in that playbacks of alarm calls in the absence of predators lead to escape behaviors that are appropriate to the type of predator which elicited the alarm calls;
 alarm calls containing descriptive information about the general size, color, and speed of travel of the predator.

Aquatic mammals
Bottlenose dolphins:  Dolphins can hear one another up to 6 miles apart underwater. In one National Geographic article, the success of a mother dolphin communicating with her baby using a telephone was outlined. Researchers noted that it appeared that both dolphins knew who they were speaking with and what they were speaking about. Not only do dolphins communicate via nonverbal cues, but they also seem to chatter and respond to other dolphin's vocalizations.
 

 Whales: Two groups of whales, the humpback whale and a subspecies of blue whale found in the Indian Ocean, are known to produce repetitious sounds at varying frequencies known as whale song. Male humpback whales perform these vocalizations only during the mating season, and so it is surmised the purpose of songs is to aid sexual selection. Humpbacks also make a sound called a feeding call, five to ten seconds in length of near constant frequency. Humpbacks generally feed cooperatively by gathering in groups, swimming underneath shoals of fish and all lunging up vertically through the fish and out of the water together. Prior to these lunges, whales make their feeding call. The exact purpose of the call is not known, but research suggests that fish react to it. When the sound was played back to them, a group of herring responded to the sound by moving away from the call, even though no whale was present.
Sea lions: Beginning in 1971 and continuing until present day, Dr. Ronald J. Schusterman and his research associates have studied sea lions' cognitive ability. They have discovered that sea lions are able to recognize relationships between stimuli based on similar functions or connections made with their peers, rather than only the stimuli's common features. This is called "equivalence classification". This ability to recognize equivalence may be a precursor to language. Research is currently being conducted at the Pinniped Cognition & Sensory Systems Laboratory to determine how sea lions form these equivalence relationships. Sea lions have also been proven to be able to understand simple syntax and commands when taught an artificial sign language similar to the one used with primates. The sea lions studied were able to learn and use a number of syntactic relations between the signs they were taught, such as how the signs should be arranged in relation to each other. However, the sea lions rarely used the signs semantically or logically. In the wild it's thought that sea lions use the reasoning skills associated with equivalence classification in order to make important decisions that can affect their rate of survival (e.g. recognizing friends and family or avoiding enemies and predators). Sea lions use the following to display their language:
 Sea lions use their bodies in various postural positions to display communication.
 Sea lion's vocal cords limit their ability to convey sounds to a range of barks, chirps, clicks, moans, growls and squeaks.
 There has yet to be an experiment which proves for certain that sea lions use echolocation as a means of communication.
The effects of learning on auditory signaling in these animals is of special interest. Several investigators have pointed out that some marine mammals appear to have an extraordinary capacity to alter both the contextual and structural features of their vocalizations as a result of experience. Janik and Slater (2000) have stated that learning can modify the emission of vocalizations in one of two ways: (1) by influencing the context in which a particular signal is used and/or (2) by altering the acoustic structure of the call itself. Male California sea lions can learn to inhibit their barking in the presence of any male dominant to them, but vocalize normally when dominant males are absent. Recent work on gray seals show different call types can be selectively conditioned and placed under biased control of different cues (Schusterman, in press) and the use of food reinforcement can also modify vocal emissions. "Hoover", a captive male harbor seal demonstrated a convincing case of vocal mimicry. However similar observations have not been reported since. Still shows under the right circumstances pinnipeds may use auditory experience, in addition to environmental consequences such as food reinforcement and social feedback to modify their vocal emissions.

In a 1992 study, Robert Gisiner and Ronald J. Schusterman conducted experiments in which they attempted to teach Rocky, a female California sea lion, syntax. Rocky was taught signed words, then she was asked to perform various tasks dependent on word order after viewing a signed instruction. It was found that Rocky was able to determine relations between signs and words, and form a basic form of syntax. A 1993 study by Ronald J Schusterman and David Kastak found that the California sea lion was capable of understanding abstract concepts such as symmetry, sameness and transitivity. This provides a strong backing to the theory that equivalence relations can form without language.

The distinctive sound of sea lions is produced both above and below water. To mark territory, sea lions "bark", with non-alpha males making more noise than alphas. Although females also bark, they do so less frequently and most often in connection with birthing pups or caring for their young. Females produce a highly directional bawling vocalization, the pup attraction call, which helps mother and pup locate one another. As noted in Animal Behavior, their amphibious lifestyle has made them need acoustic communication for social organization while on land.

Sea lions can hear frequencies as low as 100 Hz and as high as 40,000 Hz and vocalize between the ranges of 100 to 10,000 Hz.

Mollusks
 Caribbean reef squid have been shown to communicate using a variety of color, shape, and texture changes. Squid are capable of rapid changes in skin color and pattern through nervous control of chromatophores. In addition to camouflage and appearing larger in the face of a threat, squids use color, patterns, and flashing to communicate with one another in various courtship rituals. Caribbean reef squid can send one message via color patterns to a squid on their right, while they send another message to a squid on their left.Byrne, R.A., U. Griebel, J.B. Wood & J.A. Mather 2003.   Berliner Geowissenschaftliche Abhandlungen 3: 29–35.

Comparison of the terms "animal language" and "animal communication"
It is worth distinguishing "animal language" from "animal communication", although there is some comparative interchange in certain cases (e.g. Cheney & Seyfarth's vervet monkey call studies). Thus "animal language" typically does not include bee dancing, bird song, whale song, dolphin signature whistles, prairie dogs, nor the communicative systems found in most social mammals. The features of language as listed above are a dated formulation by Hockett in 1960. Through this formulation Hockett made one of the earliest attempts to break down features of human language for the purpose of applying Darwinian gradualism. Although an influence on early animal language efforts (see below), is today not considered the key architecture at the core of "animal language" research.

Animal Language results are controversial for several reasons. (For a related controversy, see also Clever Hans.) In the 1970s, John C. Lilly was attempting to "break the code": to fully communicate ideas and concepts with wild populations of dolphins so that we could "speak" to them, and share our cultures, histories, and more. This effort failed.
Early chimpanzee work was with chimpanzee infants raised as if they were human; a test of the nature vs. nurture hypothesis.
Chimpanzees have a laryngeal structure very different from that of humans, and it has been suggested that chimpanzees are not capable of voluntary control of their breathing, although better studies are needed to accurately confirm this. This combination is thought to make it very difficult for the chimpanzees to reproduce the vocal intonations required for human language. Researchers eventually moved towards a gestural (sign language) modality, as well as "keyboard" devices laden with buttons adorned with symbols (known as "lexigrams") that the animals could press to produce artificial language. Other chimpanzees learned by observing human subjects performing the task.
This latter group of researchers studying chimpanzee communication through symbol recognition (keyboard) as well as through the use of sign language (gestural), are on the forefront of communicative breakthroughs in the study of animal language, and they are familiar with their subjects on a first name basis: Sarah, Lana, Kanzi, Koko, Sherman, Austin and Chantek.

Perhaps the best known critic of "Animal Language" is Herbert Terrace. Terrace's 1979 criticism using his own research with the chimpanzee Nim Chimpsky was scathing and basically spelled the end of animal language research in that era, most of which emphasized the production of language by animals. In short, he accused researchers of over-interpreting their results, especially as it is rarely parsimonious to ascribe true intentional "language production" when other simpler explanations for the behaviors (gestural hand signs) could be put forth. Also, his animals failed to show generalization of the concept of reference between the modalities of comprehension and production; this generalization is one of many fundamental ones that are trivial for human language use. The simpler explanation according to Terrace was that the animals had learned a sophisticated series of context-based behavioral strategies to obtain either primary (food) or social reinforcement, behaviors that could be over-interpreted as language use.

In 1984 during this anti-Animal Language backlash, Louis Herman published an account of artificial language in the bottlenosed dolphin in the journal Cognition. A major difference between Herman's work and previous research was his emphasis on a method of studying language comprehension only (rather than language comprehension and production by the animal(s)), which enabled rigorous controls and statistical tests, largely because he was limiting his researchers to evaluating the animals' physical behaviors (in response to sentences) with blinded observers, rather than attempting to interpret possible language utterances or productions. The dolphins' names here were Akeakamai and Phoenix. Irene Pepperberg used the vocal modality for language production and comprehension in a grey parrot named Alex in the verbal mode, and Sue Savage-Rumbaugh continues to study bonobos such as Kanzi and Panbanisha. R. Schusterman duplicated many of the dolphin results in his California sea lions ("Rocky"), and came from a more behaviorist tradition than Herman's cognitive approach. Schusterman's emphasis is on the importance on a learning structure known as "equivalence classes."

However, overall, there has not been any meaningful dialog between the linguistics and animal language spheres, despite capturing the public's imagination in the popular press. Also, the growing field of language evolution is another source of future interchange between these disciplines. Most primate researchers tend to show a bias toward a shared pre-linguistic ability between humans and chimpanzees, dating back to a common ancestor, while dolphin and parrot researchers stress the general cognitive principles underlying these abilities. More recent related controversies regarding animal abilities include the closely linked areas of Theory of mind, Imitation (e.g. Nehaniv & Dautenhahn, 2002), Animal Culture (e.g. Rendell & Whitehead, 2001), and Language Evolution (e.g. Christiansen & Kirby, 2003).

There has been a recent emergence in animal language research which has contested the idea that animal communication is less sophisticated than human communication. Denise Herzing has done research on dolphins in the Bahamas whereby she created a two-way conversation via a submerged keyboard. The keyboard allows divers to communicate with wild dolphins. By using sounds and symbols on each key the dolphins could either press the key with their nose or mimic the whistling sound emitted in order to ask humans for a specific prop. This ongoing experiment has shown that in non-linguistic creatures brilliant and rapid thinking does occur despite our previous conceptions of animal communication. Further research done with Kanzi using lexigrams has strengthened the idea that animal communication is much more complex than we once thought.

See also

Researchers

Animals

References

Further reading
 Bickerton, D. (2005). Language evolution: a brief guide for linguists. link
 Deacon, T. W. (1997) The Symbolic Species: The Co-evolution of Language and the Human Brain. Allen Lane: The Penguin Press, 
 
 
 Gardner R. Allen and Gardner Beatrice T. (1980) Comparative psychology and language acquisition. In Thomas A. Sebok and Jean-Umiker-Sebok (eds.): Speaking of Apes: A Critical Anthology of Two-Way Communication with Man. New York: Plenum Press, pp. 287–329.
 
 
 
 Hayes, C. (1951). The Ape in Our House. New York: Harper & Row.
 
 
 
 Holder, M. D., Herman, L. M. & Kuczaj, S. III (1993). A bottlenosed dolphin's responses to anomalous gestural sequences expressed within an artificial gestural language. In H. R. Roitblat, L. M. Herman & P.E. Nachtigall (Eds): Language and Communication: Comparative Perspectives, 299–308. Hillsdale, NJ: Lawrence Erlbaum.
 Hurford J.R., Studdert-Kennedy, M., & Knight, C. (Eds.) (1998) Approaches to the evolution of language: Social and cognitive bases. Cambridge: Cambridge University Press.
 Huxley, Julian & Ludwig Koch (photographs by Ylla) 1938. Animal language. Text by Julian Huxley, long-playing record of animal language by Ludwig Koch. London, Country Life. Reprinted and republished by Grosset & Dunlap, New York 1964. Record in the 1964 reissue is by Columbia Special Products, 33 1/3 rpm, small format, ZVT 88894. Side 1 contains Sounds at the Zoo (presumably Zoological Society of London) and African sounds; side 2 African sounds continued.
 

 Kellogg, W.N., & Kellogg, L.A. (1933). The ape and the child.  New York: Whittlesey House (McGraw-Hill).
 Knight, C., Studdert-Kennedy, M., Hurford, J.R. (Eds.) (2000). The evolutionary emergence of language: Social function and the origins of linguistic form. Cambridge: Cambridge University Press.
 Kohts. N. (1935). Infant ape and human child. Museum Darwinianum, Moscow.
 Ladygina-Kohts, N.N, & de Waal, F.B.M. (2002). Infant Chimpanzee and Human Child: A Classic 1935 Comparative Study of Ape Emotions and Intelligence (Tr: B. Vekker).  New York: Oxford University Press.
 
 Miles, H.L. (1990) "The cognitive foundations for reference in a signing orangutan" in S.T. Parker and K.R. Gibson (eds.) "Language" and intelligence in monkeys and apes: Comparative Developmental Perspectives. Cambridge Univ. Press.
 Pinker, S. (1984).  Language Learnability and Language Development. Cambridge, MA: Harvard University Press.  Reprinted in 1996 with additional commentary.
 
 Plooij, F.X. (1978). "Some basic traits of language in wild chimpanzees?" in A. Lock (ed.) Action, Gesture and Symbol. New York: Academic Press.
 
 Roitblat, H.R., Herman, L.M. & Nachtigall, P.E. (Eds.)(1993). Language and Communication: Comparative Perspectives, 299–308. Hillsdale, NJ: Lawrence Erlbaum.
 Rumbaugh Duane M. (1980) Language behavior of apes. In Thomas A. Sebok and Jean-Umiker-Sebok(eds.): Speaking of Apes: A Critical Anthology of Two- Way Communication with Man. New York: Plenum Press, pp. 231–259.
 
 Sayigh, L.S., Tyack, P.L., Wells, R.S. & Scott, M.D. (1990).  Signature whistles of free-ranging bottlenose dolphins (Tursiops truncatus): stability and mother-offspring comparisons. Behavioral Ecology and Sociobiology'', 247–260.
 
 
 
 
 Skinner, B.F. (1957). Verbal behavior. Englewood Cliffs, NJ: Prentice-Hall.

External links
 Discussion: Starling Study: Recursion (Linguist List)
 International Bioacoustics Council research on animal language.
 The Animal Communication Project. More information on animal communication.
 Excellent compendium of links to the websites of all of the major animal language studies
 Listen to Nature includes article "The Language of Birds"
 Jarvis Lab homepage Evolution of Brain Structure for Vocal Learning
 :de:Linguogenetik

Animal communication
Human–animal communication